Grant Roelofsen (born 26 July 1996) is a South African cricketer. He made his first-class debut for Gauteng in the 2016–17 Sunfoil 3-Day Cup on 13 October 2016. He was the leading run-scorer in the 2017–18 Sunfoil 3-Day Cup for KwaZulu-Natal Inland, with 781 runs in ten matches.

In September 2018, he was named in KwaZulu-Natal Inland's squad for the 2018 Africa T20 Cup. He was the leading run-scorer in the 2019–20 Momentum One Day Cup, with 588 runs in ten matches. In July 2020, Roelofsen was named one-day player of the year at Cricket South Africa's annual awards ceremony.

In April 2021, Roelofsen was named in the South Africa Emerging Men's squad for their six-match tour of Namibia. Later the same month, he was named in KwaZulu-Natal's squad, ahead of the 2021–22 cricket season in South Africa.

References

External links
 

1996 births
Living people
South African cricketers
Gauteng cricketers
KwaZulu-Natal Inland cricketers
Dolphins cricketers
Cricketers from Johannesburg
White South African people
Essex cricketers
Alumni of King Edward VII School (Johannesburg)